Scene study is a technique used to teach acting. One or more actors perform a dramatic scene and are then offered feedback from teachers, classmates, or each other.

Scene Study is a very broad description for an acting class that will vary depending on the teacher or school that teaches it.  Its foundation is in the performance of a "scene" or a segment of a play by the students.  From this performance the instructor gives notes and suggestions to improve the student’s acting. Scene Study is instrumental for actors to get experience being directed. For beginning actors the Scene Study class may also include acting exercises that help them develop their technique. 

Uta Hagen's textbook Respect for Acting,  mentions the three entrances in Part Two, chapter twelve. The moment before is the first entrance, actors must think of the scene before entering the stage. Actors entering in scene one must think of what the character's circumstances before the play would be. These exercises may help with skills such as emotional connection or character development and for the real novice it may be used to teach the vocabulary of acting (for example terms like down stage and subtext). Other acting vocabulary includes objective, tactics, essential action, character, scene, acts, costumes, setting, and literal action. Objective, essential action, and literal action relates to what the character wants, as well as what the character is doing. Tactics are what the character does in order to get what they want. The other terms are design elements or basic elements that one sees on stage. It is the job of the actor to implement all of these terms in order to create a believable moment. However, most Scene Study classes are used for actors who already have their training and technique and now need the opportunity to take their skills and apply them towards performing on stage or on set.  

The best Scene Study classes will be able to keep improving an actor’s technique, as well as give them the opportunity to be directed and see if they are able to perform to a director’s specification. Scene Study is important because it allows an actor to see if all the techniques and exercises they use in class can be harnessed to create an honest and dynamic performance. Scene study is also important because the actor needs to focus on the other actor. Reacting is just as important as acting, if the actor fails to react to their scene partner then the believability diminishes. Scene study gives the actors the opportunity to work together and remember that it is not "all about them."

References 
 
 

Acting
Teaching
Pedagogy